Sokyriany is a small city in Dnistrovskyi Raion, Chernivtsi Oblast (province) of Ukraine, Northern Bessarabia. It hosts the administration of Sokyriany urban hromada, one of the hromadas of Ukraine. Population:

History
The oldest written mention of Sokyriany dates back to 1666, when the Ottoman troops conquered Moldova and Bukovina. In the Middle Ages, Sokyriany were part of the Moldavian principality.

In January 1918, Soviet power was proclaimed in Sokyrian Oblast, and the confiscation of landlord lands began. In November 1918, Bessarabia, including the Sokiryan region, was occupied by Austro-German troops, thus royal Romania. After joining the USSR on November 12, 1940, the Bukovina Krai was formed Sokyryansky district.

In the 60s of the 20th century, the territory of the Sokyrian region was part of the Kelmenets district. In the mid-1960s, Sokyryan district was restored within its previous administrative boundaries. City since 1966.

In January 1989, the population was 11 819 people.

In January 2013, the population was 9462 people.

Until 18 July 2020, Sokyriany served as an administrative center of Sokyriany Raion. The raion was abolished in July 2020 as part of the administrative reform of Ukraine, which reduced the number of raions of Chernivtsi Oblast to three. The area of Sokyriany Raion was merged into Dnistrovskyi Raion.

References

External links
 Official web-site of Sokyriany Regional State Administration

Cities of district significance in Ukraine
Khotinsky Uyezd
Hotin County
Ținutul Suceava
Cities in Chernivtsi Oblast